"Ba Yonga Wamba" is a dance-pop song performed by German group Banaroo. The song was written by Carsten Wegener and produced by 	Carsten Wegener and Timo Hohnholz for Banaroos fourth album Fly Away (2007). It was released as a single on 23 March 2007 in Germany.

Track listing 
CD Single 1
 "Ba Yonga Wamba"
 "Fast Dancehall Mix"
 "Chilly Island Mix"
 "Instrumental"
 "Don't Leave"
 "Ba Yonga Wamba (Video)"

CD Single 2
 "Ba Yonga Wamba"
 "Instrumental"

Charts

References 

Banaroo songs
2007 singles
2007 songs
Universal Records singles